Stephen Hugh Claycomb (August 11, 1847 – June 6, 1930) was a nineteenth-century politician and attorney from Missouri.  He was Lieutenant Governor of Missouri from 1889 to 1893.

Biography
Claycomb was born in Waverly, Missouri on August 11, 1847.  He attended college in Illinois and Michigan.  He then graduated from the University of Virginia School of Law (then the "law department") in 1869, and was admitted to the Saline County, Missouri bar.  In 1873 he was admitted to the Jasper County, Missouri bar and practiced in Joplin.

Claycomb was elected to the state legislature from Jasper County, becoming a state representative in 1884, and a state senator in 1886.  In 1888 he was elected Lieutenant Governor of Missouri, serving under Governor David R. Francis from January 1889 to January 1893.  Claycomb was among those considered in 1892 by the Missouri Democratic Party to run for governor, but William J. Stone, who was from the same area of the state, won the nomination instead.

In 1910, Claycomb was ejected from his Baptist church in Joplin for advocating against Prohibition, arguing that the Bible supports drinking alcohol and that drinking coffee was more harmful than liquor.

Claycomb died in Joplin, Missouri on June 6, 1930.(12 June 1930). S.H. Claycomb Dies at his home in Joplin, Neosho Times

He married Sallie Elizabeth Hayden in 1874 in Nevada, Missouri.

References

1847 births
1930 deaths
Missouri Democrats
Lieutenant Governors of Missouri
19th-century American politicians
Politicians from Joplin, Missouri
People from Lafayette County, Missouri